Danilo Fabián Ortiz Soto (born 28 July 1992) is a Paraguayan footballer who plays as a centre-back for Paraguayan Primera División club 12 de Octubre.

In August 2019 he was loaned to Spanish club Elche CF by the recommendation of Christian Bragarnik. On December 24, 2019 Elche CF rescinded the contract with him and Ortiz returned to Godoy Cruz.

References

External links
 
 
 

1992 births
Living people
Sportspeople from Asunción
Paraguayan footballers
Paraguayan expatriate footballers
Paraguay international footballers
Association football defenders
Paraguayan Primera División players
Cerro Porteño players
Club Libertad footballers
Palermo F.C. players
Argentine Primera División players
Godoy Cruz Antonio Tomba footballers
Racing Club de Avellaneda footballers
Club Atlético Banfield footballers
Dorados de Sinaloa footballers
Segunda División players
Elche CF players
Club Sol de América footballers
12 de Octubre Football Club players
Deportes La Serena footballers
Primera B de Chile players
Paraguayan expatriate sportspeople in Chile
Paraguayan expatriate sportspeople in Italy
Paraguayan expatriate sportspeople in Argentina
Paraguayan expatriate sportspeople in Mexico
Paraguayan expatriate sportspeople in Spain
Expatriate footballers in Chile
Expatriate footballers in Italy
Expatriate footballers in Argentina
Expatriate footballers in Mexico
Expatriate footballers in Spain